Correios de São Tomé e Príncipe is a state-owned company 
responsible for postal services in São Tomé and Príncipe.  It is regulated by AGER (the General Regulation Authority (Autoridade Geral de Regulaçāo)

Its buildings are at Avenida Marginal 12 de Julho, the most famous street and arterial in the nation.

São Tomé and Príncipe are one of the countries without a postal code system.

Logo
Its logo are coloured red, white and blue. "Correios" is in red. It also has a red envelope with a blue enclosure on top.

History 
After independence, formal postal services existed on the island as early as 1972. São Tomé and Príncipe entered the Universal Postal Union in 1977. and the company was created on 1 January 1982 to meet the resulting obligations related to postal services.

See also 
 List of members of the Universal Postal Union

References 

São Tomé and Príncipe
1982 establishments in São Tomé and Príncipe